Shannon Johnson Kershner is the current pastor of Fourth Presbyterian Church in Chicago. Succeeding John Buchanan as Fourth's pastor, Kershner was voted to lead the congregation on March 2, 2014. She began serving the community on May 1 of that year, and gave her first sermon to the congregation on May 18. Kershner has previously worked as pastor at Black Mountain Presbyterian Church in Black Mountain, North Carolina; and for Woodhaven Presbyterian Church in Irving, Texas. She graduated from Trinity University in San Antonio, Texas with a Bachelor of Arts degree before going on to receive a Master of Divinity from Columbia Theological Seminary. While studying at Columbia, Kershner served as a Pastoral Intern in Texas and Georgia, most prominently at Central Presbyterian Church in Atlanta. Shannon has a husband named Greg Kershner, and two children, Hannah Kershner and Ryan Kershner. Greg is a Financial Advisor at Raymond James and went to Baylor University before he attended Columbia Theological Seminary. Hannah is 20 and Ryan is 17.

References

Year of birth missing (living people)
Living people
Trinity University (Texas) alumni
Columbia Theological Seminary alumni
American Presbyterian ministers
Women Christian clergy